"Weapon X" is a comic book story arc written and illustrated by Barry Windsor-Smith and published by American company Marvel Comics. The story arc appears in Marvel Comics Presents #72–84 and tells the story of Wolverine during his time in Weapon X. Only the prologue and part of the final chapter are told from the perspective of Wolverine, who is in a near mindless state for the bulk of the story. Instead, three members of the Weapon X team serve as the protagonists: Abraham Cornelius, Carol Hines, and a man referred to within the story as only "the Professor".

Much of the story arc roughly follows the formula of a slasher film, with the protagonists being stalked in an isolated location by a seemingly unstoppable killing machine.

Plot
The series begins with Logan being captured and prepared for the adamantium bonding process. There are several mentions of his being tough, and the Professor, the director of the Weapon X program, along with his assistants Dr. Cornelius and Miss Hines, wipe his mind and bond him to adamantium, the hardest known substance on Earth, to prepare him to be a mindless, soulless killing machine. Prior to Wolverine volume 2, #75, the plot had too much adamantium bonded to his forearms, resulting in his claws, leading to the development of tubes in his flesh to keep the skin apart for claw extraction.

Throughout the program, Logan is constantly referred to not as a person but as a subject, and his humanity is almost completely disregarded in the course of the experiments. Logan frequently comes to odds with his mental programming, and eventually escapes into the wilderness after killing all of the soldiers there (except for one, future Weapon X Director Malcom Colcord) while the Professor, Cornelius, and Hines lock themselves in a secured room that Logan cannot break into.

Sequel
Issue 48 of Wolverine's first ongoing series has a cover plugging itself as "The sequel to Weapon X". The issue involves Wolverine making preliminary investigations into his past, and included remakes of three scenes from the Weapon X story. It is collected in Wolverine Visionaries: Marc Silvestri, among other Wolverine stories from the era.

Collected editions
The story has been collected numerous times, first in a 1993 hardcover then a 2007 hardcover which was reprinted in 2009 as a paperback.

Additionally, the story is one of several others in the Best of Wolverine, Volume 1 hardcover, published in 2004, and the Wolverine Omnibus, published in 2009.

References

Fiction about amnesia
Science fiction comics